Mohamed Ali Nur, popularly known as "Ambassador Americo", was the Somali Ambassador to Kenya from October 2007 to April 2015. He was also a candidate in the 2017 Somali presidential election.

In 2007, Nur played a key role in the reopening of the Somali Embassy in Nairobi, Kenya, which had been closed for 17 years due to the outbreak of the Somali Civil War. He led the campaign that repossessed the prime embassy property in Nairobi that had been irregularly sold to private individuals in 1994 after the collapse of the Somalia government.

Nur emerged as a symbol of reconciliation in a war-torn Somalia in September 2014 when he unconditionally forgave a man who confessed to being part of a gang that killed his 18-month-old daughter in 1992. Since then, he has sought to use his story to promote reconciliation and peace in Somalia. He also supports education, health, water and environmental conservation initiatives in Somalia through Yasmin Foundation, a non-profit organization he established with his family in 2010, in memory of his late daughter.

Early life and education
Nur was born on 12 October 1962 in Mogadishu, Somalia, where he spent his childhood. He is the eldest in a family of six siblings. His father, Ali Nur "Americo", worked as a foreman in a borehole-drilling company. Later, he ran a chain of restaurants and a rental car service in Mogadishu. He also had an interest in real estate.  His mother was a housewife who died when he was 9 years old.

The nickname "Americo" was passed to Nur from his father whose fondness for American cowboy hats earned him that sobriquet from his friends, following the Somali tradition for nicknames.

Nur received his primary and high school education in Mogadishu. He then proceeded to Montgomery College, Maryland, United States where he studied economics before enrolling at the University of Maryland to further this study.

Career and life
Upon graduation in 1985, Nur returned to Somalia and in 1986 he began working at the Central Bank of Somalia (CBS) as the head of the accounting department. He also helped to manage his father's chain of businesses in Mogadishu. Nur married and had his first child when he was 26. He served at the Central Bank until the outbreak of the Somali Civil War in 1991 and the collapse of the central government.

In 1992, heavily armed men attacked his home in Mogadishu in search of valuables. In the process, his 18-month-old daughter lost her life when a grenade was thrown into the courtyard where she was playing. The deteriorating security situation in Somalia led Nur and his family to relocate to the U.S. where he lived and worked before relocating to Canada in 2000.

In 2004, Nur flew to Nairobi at the request of the newly appointed prime minister of the Transitional Federal Government (TFG) of Somalia, Ali Mohamed Ghedi, whose government was initially based in the Kenyan capital. Nur was appointed the director-general of the prime minister's office.

In 2006, the TFG relocated to Somalia, first to the south-western town of Baidoa and later to Jowhar, a city in central Somalia, but Nur remained in Nairobi. Along with a team he began efforts to reopen Somalia's embassy that had ceased operations nearly 17 years earlier at the collapse of the government. The embassy was officially reopened in 2006, which was widely welcomed by the Somali nationals in Kenya and around the globe.

Nur initially served as Charge-de-Affaires of the embassy. In October 2007, he was appointed the substantive ambassador. He officially started work after presenting his diplomatic credentials to Kenyan President Mwai Kibaki at State House, Nairobi, on 19 October 2007. The position of Somalia envoy to Kenya and Kenya–Somalia relations are considered important within Somali political and diplomatic circles, as Kenya is considered a strategic country hosting thousands of Somali refugees and investments by Somali nationals.

Nur led efforts to repossess embassy property in Nairobi that had been irregularly sold to private individuals after the collapse of the Somali government. In December 2010, after a three-year court battle, Kenya's High Court ruled in favour of the Somali government.

In 2013, a tripartite agreement was negotiated and signed by Kenya, Somalia, and the United Nations Refugee Agency (UNHCR), facilitating the voluntary and dignified repatriations of Somali refugees in Kenya. As a result of the agreement, thousands of refugees returned to Somalia while others await repatriation. Nur cited as his other accomplishments increased trade and passenger flights between Somalia and Kenya.

During his term, the Somali embassy in Nairobi became the coordination office for United Nations and international NGOs providing humanitarian assistance and support projects inside Somalia. It also provided consular support services for Somali nationals. In 2013, the embassy became the first of Somalia's diplomatic missions to issue a new Somali passport. The embassy also helped Somali refugees obtain documents from the United Nations High Commissioner for Refugees (UNHCR) and authenticated education certificates for Somali nationals seeking to study in Kenya.

Kenyan troops crossed into Somalia in October 2011, pursuing Somalia-based militant group Al Shabaab.  Al Shabaab continued attacks in Kenya at Westgate Mall (September 2013), Mpeketoni (June 2014) and Garissa University College (April 2015). Nur condemned Al Shabaab attacks inside Kenya and called for more cooperation between Kenya and Somalia in tackling the group, while also speaking out against reactionary profiling, harassment and arrests of Somali nationals and ethnic Somalis by Kenyan authorities.

After the Westgate Mall attack, Nur mobilized and led Somali nationals in Kenya to donate blood and offer financial and moral support to the victims as a show of solidarity and to ease buildup of communal tensions.

Nur served as Somalia's envoy to Kenya until April 2015 before his successor, Gamal Osman, was appointed by Somali President Hassan Sheikh Mohamud.

Reconciliation
In September 2014, Nur emerged as a symbol of reconciliation in Somalia after he unconditionally forgave a man who confessed to being part of the gang that killed his 18-month-old daughter in 1992 while robbing his home.

The man walked to him as he sat with friends at a restaurant in Mogadishu and made the dramatic confession before asking for forgiveness. Nur said that despite the shock, anger, and desire for revenge he felt in his heart, he forgave the man since he showed remorse and had the courage to confess his crime. When the two hugged in reconciliation, they both shed tears. The envoy said that after forgiving his daughter's killer, he felt "a huge weight had been lifted off his chest".

The incident attracted considerable attention among Somali nationals. Soon after the incident, similar stories of killers confessing their past crimes and being forgiven by families of their victims emerged in several parts of Somalia while the subject of national reconciliation and unity dominated public debate.

Nur has taken the cause of promoting peace and reconciliation in Somalia. During 2015 and 2016, Nur traveled to different parts of Somalia on a journey he said was to promote peace and reconciliation through a grassroots approach. He dubbed it as the "Peace Journey".

Presidential candidate

Nur was one of the twenty-one candidates who ran for President of Somalia's Federal Government in the 8 February 2017 election held in Mogadishu. He did not receive enough votes to proceed beyond the first round of voting.

He campaigned on the pledge of rebuilding the Somali National Army (SNA) to secure law and order and reduce reliance on external forces serving under the umbrella of the African Union Mission in Somalia (AMISOM). He also pledged to tackle youth unemployment by creating jobs and educational opportunities, to prevent their recruitment into Al Shabaab or from undertaking dangerous journeys to reach Europe or western countries. He also promised to catalyze grassroots reconciliation by guiding the conversation among different groups of the population.

Humanitarian work 
In 2010, Ambassador Mohammed Ali Nur and his family founded Yasmin Foundation, a humanitarian non-profit organization to support education, water, health and environmental conservation initiatives in Somalia. The foundation is named in memory of his late daughter Yasmin, who lost her life to a violent robbery in Mogadishu in 1992.  The foundation has been involved in the following projects: 

Education

 Built Yasmin School in Ceel Cirfid town in Middle Shabelle region, Somalia that is providing free primary and secondary education to children from needy backgrounds, including orphans. The support encompasses provision of books and other learning materials, and payment of teachers. 
 Supported Madina Educational Centre and Hodan School for special needs children in Mogadishu that cater for children with hearing impairments. The support involves rent payment and supply of learning materials. 

Health

 Constructed a clinic in Ceel Cirfid town, Middle Shabelle region, that’s serving mostly children and pregnant women. 

Water

 Constructed boreholes in Ceel Cirfid and Warta Shabeeleey towns in Middle Shabelle region, that are providing free water to residents, who previously had to move long distances in search of the commodity. 

Environmental Conservation

 Campaigning for planting and conservation of trees in Somalia, where charcoal and wood fuel use is driving the rapid loss trees in the country.
 Raising awareness about the importance of reducing pollution, especially from plastic waste.

References

1962 births
Living people
Somalian politicians
University System of Maryland alumni
Montgomery College alumni
Ambassadors of Somalia to Kenya